Vincent Julian Kaminski was born in Poland and worked as the Managing Director for Research at the failed energy trading corporation Enron until 2002. In this capacity he led a team of approximately fifty analysts who developed quantitative models to support energy trading. In the months preceding Enron’s bankruptcy Kaminski repeatedly raised strong objections to the financial practices of Enron’s Chief Financial Officer, Andrew Fastow, designed to fraudulently conceal the company’s burgeoning debt.

The primary practice involved hiding Enron’s debt in partnership companies managed by Fastow and financed by outside creditors. The debt was then secured against stock in the Enron Corporation itself, which was strongly valued at that time. To induce creditors to assume the risk of financing this debt certain "trigger events" were built into the contracts which would require immediate repayment of the full loan amount, such as the decline of the stock value used as collateral below a prearranged level. During the course of a company-wide comprehensive risk assessment Kaminski and his team of analysts pointed out that there existed many such arrangements, and if one were triggered the rest would be activated like dominoes as the stock price fell in response to the bad news, effectively ending the financial viability of the company. Kaminski’s strident opposition to these practices was one of the last chances to avert the implosion which soon followed.

Dr. Kaminski holds an M.S. degree in International Economics and a Ph.D. degree in Mathematical Economics from the Main School of Planning and Statistics in Warsaw (which has since been renamed Warsaw School of Economics), and an MBA from Fordham University in New York City. He teaches at the business school of Rice University in Houston, Texas, and is the author of several books on risk management and energy trading. Books by Dr. Kaminski:

Energy Modelling: Advances in the Management of Uncertainty, published by Risk Books in 2005, 

Managing Energy Price Risk: The New Challenges and Solutions, published by Risk Books in 2004, 

Energy Markets http://riskbooks.com/energy-markets, published by Risk Books on 18 January 2013,

References

External links 
 http://news.findlaw.com/wp/docs/enron/specinv020102rpt2.pdf
 http://www.risk.net/energy-risk/review/2196403/book-extract-energy-markets-by-vince-kaminski

Further reading 
 "Conspiracy of Fools: A True Story", by Kurt Eichenwald, published by Broadway Books in 2005, 
 "Power Failure: The Inside Story of the Collapse of Enron", by Mimi Schwartz and Sherron Watkins, published by Doubleday Books in 2003, 
 "Enron Figure Reappears in Amaranth Filings" by Christopher Faille, Lipper HedgeWorld

American energy industry executives
Enron people
Polish emigrants to the United States
Living people
SGH Warsaw School of Economics alumni
Fordham University alumni
Rice University faculty
Year of birth missing (living people)